The San Francisco Shamrocks were a minor professional ice hockey team that played in the Pacific Hockey League (PHL) during the 1977–78 and 1978–79 seasons. Based in Daly City, California, the team played its home games in the Cow Palace.

Coached by Wayne Rivers, the 1977–78 team compiled a 24-17-1 record, and won the Pacific Hockey League championship. 
The 1978–79 team completed less than half of its scheduled games before the Shamrocks folded on January 3, 1979.

References

1977 establishments in California
1979 disestablishments in California
Daly City, California
Defunct ice hockey teams in California
Ice hockey clubs disestablished in 1979
Ice hockey clubs established in 1977
Sports in San Mateo County, California